Events from the year 1686 in Denmark.

Incumbents
 Monarch – Christian V
 Grand Chancellor – Frederik Ahlefeldt, until his death on 7 July.

Events

Undated
 Store Bededag is introduced by the Church of Denmark, combining several Catholic holy days into a single holiday.
 Gabriel Milan is removed as Governor of the Danish West Indies and placed under arrest for treason.

Births
 5 April – Poul Vendelbo Løvenørn, Secretary of War and Minister of the Navy (died 1740)
 12 August – Bendix Grodtschilling the Youngest, painter and conchologist (died 1737)

Deaths
 29 May – Ove Juul, nobleman and vice Governor-general of Norway (born 1615)
 7 July – Frederik Ahlefeldt, statesman and Grand Chancellor (born 1623)

References

 
1680s in Denmark
Denmark
Years of the 17th century in Denmark